"I Love My Bitch" (known as "I Love My Chick" in its edited version) is a song by Busta Rhymes featuring will.i.am (who also produced the track) and Kelis, released as the second single from Busta Rhymes' seventh studio album, The Big Bang (2006).

The release date for the single in the United Kingdom was July 10, 2006. However, due to the UK chart rules allowing songs to chart on download sales alone, one week before the single's physical release, it was Busta Rhymes' second consecutive hit to make the top 40, entering at number 23 on download sales only, the same position that "Touch It" had charted at. Upon its physical release, the single became his second consecutive top ten solo hit, peaking at number eight there, two positions lower than "Touch It" had charted.

Music video
The music video "I Love My Chick" is based on the film Mr. & Mrs. Smith, directed by Benny Boom. Busta Rhymes (aka Trevor Smith) plays Mr. Smith and Gabrielle Union plays Mrs. Smith. will.i.am and Dr. Dre also appear in the video, but for unknown reasons, Kelis does not. It reached number one on BET's 106 & Park.

Track listings and formats
European CD maxi single
"I Love My Chick" (Clean Version)
"I Love My Bitch" (Dirty Version)
"Touch It" (Ultimate Remix featuring Mary J. Blige, Missy Elliott, DMX, Rah Digga, Lloyd Banks and Papoose)
"I Love My Chick" (Video)
"I Love My Bitch" (Video)

UK CD single
"I Love My Chick" (Clean Version)
"Cocaina"

UK 12" single
"I Love My Chick" (Clean Version)
"I Love My Bitch" (Dirty Version)
"Cocaina"

Special UK and European single
"I Love My Bitch" (Dirty Version)
"Touch It" (Ultimate Remix featuring Mary J. Blige, Missy Elliott, DMX, Rah Digga, Lloyd Banks and Papoose)

Charts

Weekly charts

Year-end charts

References

2006 singles
Busta Rhymes songs
Kelis songs
Music videos directed by Benny Boom
Will.i.am songs
Songs written by Busta Rhymes
Aftermath Entertainment singles
Interscope Records singles
Songs written by will.i.am
Song recordings produced by will.i.am